Live at Birdland may refer to:

 Live at Birdland (John Coltrane album), 1964
 Live at Birdland (Lee Konitz album), 2009
 Live at Birdland (John Pizzarelli album), 2003
 Live at Birdland (Toshiko - Mariano Quartet), 1991
 Live at Birdland (Lester Young album), 2007
 Extended Play: Live at Birdland, by the Dave Holland Quintet, 2001

See also
 Birdland (disambiguation)
 Birdland (New York jazz club)
 A Night at Birdland Vol. 1, a live jazz album by the Art Blakey Quintet, recorded in 1954
 A Night at Birdland Vol. 2, a live jazz album by the Art Blakey Quintet, recorded in 1954
 A Night at Birdland Vol. 3, a live jazz album by the Art Blakey Quintet, recorded in 1954